Christopher Jenner (born 3 November 1974 in Upper Hutt) is a former French professional cyclist. He became a French national in June 2000.

Major results

1994
 2nd Tour de la Creuse
1996
 1st Grand Prix du Pays d'Aix
 2nd Tour de la Creuse
 3rd Grand Prix Cristal Energie
 3rd Grand Prix de la ville de Buxerolles
1997
 1st Grand Prix de la ville de Buxerolles
 2nd Ronde de l'Isard
 3rd Bordeaux-Saintes
1999
 1st stage 7 Tour de l'Avenir
 2nd Tour de l'Ain
 1st stage 5
 3rd Trophée des Grimpeurs
 8th of Tirreno–Adriatico
2000
 7th Tour de Picardie
 8th Étoile de Bessèges
 9th GP de Fourmies
 10th Bayern Rundfahrt
2001
 1st stage 5 Tour de France (TTT)
 1st Tour of Wellington
 1st stages 1 and 4
 5th Tour Down Under
 5th Le Tour de Langkawi
2002
 1st Boucles de l'Aulne
 9th Bayern Rundfahrt

References

1974 births
Living people
New Zealand male cyclists
French male cyclists
Olympic cyclists of New Zealand
Cyclists at the 2000 Summer Olympics